Cosmas (died after 1222) was a Hungarian prelate in the first half of the 13th century, who served as Bishop of Győr from around 1219 to 1222.

Biography
Cosmas was born into an ethnic Hungarian medium landowner noble family originated from Somogy County. Prior to his bishopric, he was a canon or provost of the Székesfehérvár Chapter, an important place of authentication in the kingdom. Consequently, he was presumably a royal chaplain during the reign of Andrew II of Hungary. He was made Bishop of Győr around 1219. He was a signatory of the Golden Bull of 1222. Following that he resigned from his office and retired to the Fehérvár Chapter, where he lived for years, according to a letter of Pope Honorius III. The motivation of Cosmas' resignation is unknown. His successor, Gregory was elected bishop in 1224.

References

Sources

 
 
 
 

12th-century Hungarian people
13th-century Hungarian people
13th-century Roman Catholic bishops in Hungary
Bishops of Győr